Takhteh Sang, also rendered as Takht-e Sang or Takht-i-Sang, may refer to:
 Takhteh Sang-e Olya
 Takhteh Sang-e Sofla